"My Immortal" is a song by American rock band Evanescence from their debut studio album, Fallen (2003). It was released by Wind-up Records on December 8, 2003, as the third single from the album. An alternative version appears on the band's fourth studio album Synthesis (2017). The song was written by guitarist Ben Moody and singer and pianist Amy Lee when they were 16 and 15, respectively. Various versions of "My Immortal" were recorded, with the earliest in 1997. The version recorded for Evanescence's demo CD Origin (2000) was used on Fallen by the label against Lee's wishes, featuring Lee's demo vocals, a MIDI keyboard, and strings added during the production of Fallen. The song's single release used the re-recording Lee and Moody made for Fallen, dubbed the "band version", featuring a full band's performance after the bridge along with a new string arrangement by David Campbell.

"My Immortal" is a piano power ballad, with fictional lyrics about a lingering spirit that haunts someone. The song received generally positive reviews. It was commercially successful, peaking within the top ten in over 10 countries. It charted at number seven on the US Billboard Hot 100 and topped the charts in Canada, Greece and Portugal, as well as on the Billboard Adult Pop Songs chart. The single was certified gold in the US and platinum in Australia. In 2005, it received a nomination for Best Pop Performance by a Duo or Group with Vocals at the 47th Grammy Awards. An accompanying music video directed by David Mould was filmed in black-and-white in Gothic Quarter, Barcelona. The video was nominated for the MTV Video Music Award for Best Rock Video.

Background and recording
The earliest known demo of "My Immortal" was recorded in 1997, which solely featured Lee's vocals and piano and slightly different lyrics. The song was intended to be included on the band's self-titled EP but was cut before it was released. In 2000, the song was re-recorded for the band's demo album, Origin, which contains a rearranged piano melody and lyrics, including the bridge added by Lee. A version of the song is also featured on the band's 2003 EP, Mystary. 

The bandmembers had recorded a demo of "My Immortal" at the radio station where Lee's father worked after it was empty late at night; this recording, comprising a MIDI keyboard and Lee's demo vocal performance as a teen, is the version used on Fallen per the label's demand, to Lee's displeasure. Lee stated:  Lee later said she also dislikes it because she "sounds like a little kid" and the album version does not use David Campbell's orchestration. Moody is credited on the album with producing the song, while on the single's CD Dave Fortman and Moody are credited with production on both the album version and band version of the song. The added strings on the album version were arranged by Graeme Revell for the Daredevil soundtrack. 

When "My Immortal" became a single, Lee and Moody chose the recording they had made for Fallen that the label originally rejected. This single recording is dubbed the "band version", featuring a full band performance after the bridge and during the final chorus of the song, as well as Campbell's orchestration. It is the version used on the song's music video and for radio. The later pressings of Fallen contain the single version (or "band version") of "My Immortal" as a hidden track.

Composition

"My Immortal"'s words were originally written by Moody from fiction and the song's composition was made by Moody and Lee. Moody and Lee wrote the song when they were 16 and 15, respectively, and the bridge was later added by Lee. The fictional lyrics of the song refer to a spirit that haunts the memory of a grieving loved one, according to MTV. Lee considers it "Ben [Moody]'s song". She said he writes from the point of view of a "storyteller", while she wrote from her own feelings and experiences. 

"My Immortal" is a piano power ballad. John Bean of The Providence Journal called it a "gothic ballad". Michael Clark of the Houston Chronicle viewed it as "goth-meets-pop", and MTV described it as a "delicate, heartfelt ballad". A writer for IGN said "My Immortal" is thematically a song of pain and despair". Lee's vocals are accompanied by a simple piano and some "symphonic dressings". According to the sheet music published by Alfred Music Publishing on the website Musicnotes.com, the song is set in common time and performed in slow and free tempo of 80 beats per minute. Lee's vocal range for the song runs from the low musical note of A3 to the high note of C5.

Critical reception
"My Immortal" received generally positive reviews. Kirk Miller of Rolling Stone said that the song "lets Lee wail about her personal demons over simple piano and some symphonic dressings". Richard Harrington of The Washington Post called it a "majestic" song. Blair R. Fischer from MTV News described "My Immortal" as a "delicate, heartfelt ballad". Reviewing a live show, IGNs Ed Thompson regarded it "one of the first and best songs Evanescence ever wrote". Blair R. Fischer of Chicago Tribune said that Lee sounds "simply heavenly on the aberrant, elegant strings-soaked ballad". Jordan Reimer of The Daily Princetonian found a "haunting beauty" in the song. Writing for The Guardian, Tom Reynolds deemed "My Immortal" a "whimpering post-breakup tune" and "overwrought", listing it as one of his top 25 "miserable" tracks.

In 2005, the song received a Grammy Award nomination for Best Pop Performance by a Duo or Group with Vocals. "My Immortal" has been considered by some media outlets as one of Evanescence's best songs, with  Loudwire and Kerrang ranking it in the top five of their lists of best Evanescence songs.

Chart performance
"My Immortal" peaked within the top 20 of over 10 countries. On the chart issue dated April 10, 2004, the song peaked at number seven on the Billboard Hot 100, and at number two on the Pop Songs chart on March 27, 2004. It also reached number 19 on the Adult Contemporary chart, and topped Billboards Adult Pop Songs chart. On the Billboard Radio Songs chart, the song peaked at number seven on April 10, 2004. "My Immortal" was certified Gold by the Recording Industry Association of America (RIAA) on February 17, 2009, for selling more than 500,000 copies in the United States. Its single release also helped Fallen move from number nine to number three on the Billboard 200 chart, selling another 69,000 copies. Nielsen Broadcast Data Systems placed the song at number six on the list of most played radio songs in 2004 with 317,577 spins.

Internationally, the song topped the charts of Canada, Greece, and Portugal. On the Australian Singles Chart, it debuted at number four on January 25, 2004, peaking at that position for three weeks. The next eight weeks, it remained in the top ten of the chart, and it last appeared at number 44 for the week of June 13, 2004. The single was certified platinum by the Australian Recording Industry Association (ARIA) for shipment of 70,000 copies in that country. On New Zealand's RIANZ chart, the song debuted at number 49 on December 19, 2003. On January 25, it climbed from number 34 to number seven. It fell to number eight the next week, then rose up to number two on February 8, blocked from the top position by Baby Bash's "Suga Suga". The next week, it fell to number nine, then spent three more non-consecutive weeks in the top ten. May 10 was its last week inside the top 50, appearing at number 32.

On December 14, 2003, "My Immortal" debuted at number seven on the UK Singles Chart which later also became its peak position. On February 15, 2004 the song dropped out of the top 100. It later re-entered at number 84 on July 13, 2008. After spending several weeks on different positions on the UK Rock Chart, on August 21, 2011, it peaked at number one. The next week, "My Immortal" moved to number two after being replaced by the band's single "What You Want" (2011); a week later, it returned to number one on the chart. The song re-entered the UK Singles Chart at number 81 on August 21, 2011 and at number 89 on October 16, 2011. It also charted for six weeks on Ireland's IRMA chart, peaking at number 20.

Music video

A music video directed by David Mould was filmed entirely in black-and-white in Plaça de Sant Felip Neri, Gothic Quarter, Barcelona. Lee said they filmed it in an "old area of town", with some of footage from a "scenic point, and there was a rooftop where you could see Barcelona below." 

Lee said the video "is all about separation" and she wanted it "to depict real human sadness." The video was filmed two weeks before Moody's departure from the band. Lee admitted that the video's visuals were conspicuous in retrospect but the similarities between that and Moody's departure was coincidental.

According to Jon Wiederhorn from MTV News, the shots of the video are "evocative and artistic, resembling a cross between a foreign film and a Chanel advertisement." Joe D'Angelo of MTV News said that Lee's disconnection in the video shows a "distressed and emotionally wrought heroine." Rob Sheffield of Rolling Stone praised the video saying that Lee looked like a "teen-misery titan" and that she "tiptoed through a marble castle of pain". The music video received an MTV Video Music Award nomination for Best Rock Video at the 2004 MTV Video Music Awards.

Live performances
Evanescence performed the song on the Late Show with David Letterman in March 2004, and at the 2004 Billboard Music Awards in December 2004. A live performance of the song from their Le Zénith, Paris show is featured on their concert CD/DVD, Anywhere but Home (2004). Evanescence performed the song on their 2011 Rock in Rio festival show on October 2, 2011.

Usage in media
"My Immortal" was featured on the soundtrack of the film Daredevil (2003) along with "Bring Me to Life". The song has been used in several television episodes. It is featured in the Smallville season three episode "Memoria". Lucy Walsh, a contestant of the show Rock the Cradle, covered the song during the fifth episode, "Judge's Picks". Dancer Hampton Williams performed to this song during his audition for the season 9 premiere of So You Think You Can Dance, and in season 11 the song accompanied a performance by the top seven women, choreographed by Mandy Moore and broadcast on July 30, 2014.

Personnel
Credits are adapted from the liner notes of Fallen.
 Ben Moody – writing, guitar
 Amy Lee – writing, vocals, piano, keyboards
 Francesco DiCosmo – bass guitar
 David Hodges – piano, keyboards
 Graeme Revell – string arrangements (album version)
 David Campbell – string arrangements (single version)
 Dave Fortman – production, mixing
 Ben Moody – production

Track listings

 CD single (released December 8, 2003)
 "My Immortal" (band version) – 4:33
 "My Immortal" (album version) – 4:24
 CD maxi single (released December 8, 2003)
 "My Immortal" (band version) – 4:33
 "My Immortal" (album version) – 4:24
 "Haunted" (Live from Sessions@AOL) – 3:08
 "My Immortal" (Live from Cologne) – 4:15

 Promo – CD maxi single (2003)
 "My Immortal" (band version / no strings) – 4:33
 "My Immortal" (band version / guitars down) – 4:33
 "My Immortal" (album version) – 4:24

Charts

Weekly charts

Year-end charts

Decade-end charts

Certifications

Release history

See also
 List of Canadian number-one singles of 2004
 Hot Adult Top 40 Tracks number-one hits of 2004
 List of UK Rock Chart number-one singles of 2011

References

1997 songs
2000s ballads
2003 singles
Barcelona in popular culture
Black-and-white music videos
Canadian Singles Chart number-one singles
Daredevil (film series)
Epic Records singles
Evanescence songs
Music videos shot in Spain
Number-one singles in Greece
Number-one singles in Portugal
Pop ballads
Rock ballads
Songs written by Amy Lee
Songs written by Ben Moody
Wind-up Records singles
Gothic rock songs